The 2004 Indian general election in Karnataka, occurred for 28 seats in the state. Of the 28 seats, 24 belonged to the general category and 4 were belonging to SC category.

Results

List of elected MPs
Source: Election Commission of India

Results by Party

See also
 Elections in Karnataka

References

External links
 Website of Election Commission of India

Indian general elections in Karnataka
2000s in Karnataka
Karnataka